The highway lobby, also known as the "road gang", "motordom", or the “highwaymen”, is a collective of industry interests that advocate for an automobile-centric society. It is made up of corporate interests representing the automobile, oil, construction, rubber, asphalt, trucking, and limestone industries. The term is often used as a pejorative by those who accuse this broad interest group of "Asphalt Socialism", or those who accuse the lobby of nefarious actions. The highway revolts, the Highway Action Coalition, pedestrian movements, and many other modern civil society organizations, are a response to this lobby. One example of the highway lobby is the American Highway Users Alliance that represents its interests. The highway lobby exists in many countries, for example the US, France, Italy through the group "Friends of the Automobile" or Malaysia.

References

Further reading

 
 
 
 
 
 
 
 
 

Lobbying organizations in the United States
Automobile associations in the United States